Edward Petty was a state legislator in South Carolina. He served in the South Carolina House of Representatives from 1872 to 1874. He lived in Charleston County, South Carolina.

He corresponded about ordinance.

He was one of the incorporators of the Toglio Ferry Company. It served areas around Charleston including Edisto Island.

References

Year of birth missing
Year of death missing
Date of birth missing
Place of birth missing
African-American politicians during the Reconstruction Era
Members of the South Carolina House of Representatives
People from Charleston County, South Carolina
African-American state legislators in South Carolina